Patek is a surname with multiple etymologies. In the Czech Republic, it is spelled Pátek (feminine: Pátková) and comes from pátek ("Friday").

Notable people with the surname include:
 Adolf Patek (1900–1982), Austrian footballer
 Antoni Patek (1811–1877), Polish watchmaker
 Artur Patek (born 1965), Polish historian
 Freddie Patek (born 1944), American baseball player
 Jarmila Pátková (born 1953), Czech rower
 Jewell Patek (born 1971), American politician
 Kristýna Pátková (born 1998), Czech ice hockey player
 Maria Patek (born 1958), Austrian civil servant
 Rebecca Patek, American choreographer
 Stanisław Patek (1866–1944), Polish diplomat
 Umar Patek (born 1970), Indonesian terrorist

See also
 
 Petek (surname)

Czech-language surnames